Chon Fernando Gallegos (September 28, 1939 – January 17, 2023) was an American football quarterback who played one season with the Oakland Raiders of the American Football League (AFL). Gallegos first enrolled at San Jose City College before transferring to San Jose State University. He attended James Lick High School in San Jose, California.

Following his player career, he coached at James Lick High School and Santa Teresa High School.  At James Lick, he served as Jim Plunkett's coach and at Santa Teresa he oversaw Rich Campbell and Craig Whelihan. He coached Santa Teresa High School from 1974 to 1992 and compiled a 113–77–3 record.

See also
 List of NCAA major college football yearly passing leaders

References

External links
 
 College stats

1939 births
Living people
American football quarterbacks
Oakland Raiders players
San Jose City Jaguars football players
San Jose State Spartans football players
High school football coaches in California
People from Gallup, New Mexico
Coaches of American football from California
Players of American football from San Jose, California